Barhiya, station code BRYA, serves the municipal city of Barahiya in the Lakhisarai district in the Indian state of Bihar. The station belongs to the Danapur railway division of East Central Railway. Barhiya is connected to metropolitan areas of India, by the Delhi–Kolkata main line via Mugalsarai–Patna route which runs along the historic  Grand Trunk Road. Railways and roads are the main means of transport in the Barhiya region. Due to its location on Howrah–Patna–Mughalsarai main line, most of the Patna, Barauni-bound express trains coming from Howrah, Sealdah, Ranchi, Tatanagar, stop here.
The Sahibganj loop line leaves Munger district, and enters Lakhisarai district near the Barhiya Station.

History 

Barhiya Station had been considered as one of the chief trade centres on the railway even in the British colonial period, due to its proximity to rivers and rail lines.

Facilities 
The major facilities available are waiting rooms, computerized reservation facility, reservation counter, and vehicle parking. Vehicles are allowed to enter the station premises. The station also has STD/ISD/PCO telephone booth, toilets, tea stall and book stall.

Platforms 

There are three platforms here.

Trains 
Many passenger and express trains serve Barhiya station.

Nearest airports 
The nearest airports to Barhiya station are:
 Birsa Munda Airport, Ranchi  
 Gaya Airport 
 Lok Nayak Jayaprakash Airport, Patna 
 Netaji Subhash Chandra Bose International Airport, Kolkata

References

External links 
 Barhiya Junction Map
 Official website of the Lakhisarai district

Railway stations in Lakhisarai district
Danapur railway division